Lorenzo Antonio Melgarejo Sanabria (born 10 August 1990) is a Paraguayan footballer who plays as a forward or left winger for Paraguayan club Libertad.

After playing in his country with 12 de Octubre, Olimpia and Independiente, he went on to spend most of his professional career in Portugal and Russia, starting out at Benfica. 

Melgarejo won four caps for Paraguay.

Club career

Early years / Benfica

Melgarejo was born in Loma Grande District. He started his professional career with Club 12 de Octubre at the age of 19, and later moved to the capital, Asunción, where he represented Club Olimpia and Independiente FBC.

In early June 2011, Melgarejo moved to Portugal after being signed by Primeira Liga club S.L. Benfica, who immediately loaned him to fellow league side F.C. Paços de Ferreira for one season.

Melgarejo scored on his debut with Paços, a 2–1 home win against U.D. Leiria. He also found the net against FC Porto in a 1–1 draw on 25 March 2012, also at home, and finished the campaign as the team's top scorer.

For 2012–13, Benfica manager Jorge Jesus decided to recall Melgarejo and reconvert him into a left back, also immediately placing him as a starter. On 17 September, in spite of initial criticism, his contract was extended until June 2018 with a release clause of €30 million.

Melgarejo spent most of the campaign in the starting eleven, including in the UEFA Europa League final, but was an unused substitute in the season's Portuguese Cup final, with Benfica losing both matches.

Kuban

In July 2013, it was widely reported that Liverpool had agreed a deal to sign Melgarejo on loan, with a view to making the move permanent at the end of the season, but no transfer took place. Instead, on 2 September, he signed with Russian Premier League club FC Kuban Krasnodar for a €5 million fee.

Spartak Moscow
On 8 February 2016, Melgarejo joined FC Spartak Moscow on a long-term contract.

Racing
On 25 August 2020, he signed a contract until the end of 2022 with Argentinian club Racing.

International career
On 14 November 2012, Melgarejo made his debut for Paraguay, playing the second half of a 3–1 friendly win over Guatemala. In August 2017, he spoke in an interview of his frustration of not receiving a call up for the national team after six years in Europe.

On 2 March 2019, more than five years after his last selection, Melgarejo was called by manager Eduardo Berizzo ahead of that month's friendlies with Peru and Mexico.

Career statistics

Notes

Honours
Benfica
Taça de Portugal: Runner-up 2012–13
UEFA Europa League: Runner-up 2012–13

Kuban
Russian Cup: Runner-up 2014–15

Spartak Moscow 
Russian Premier League: 2016–17
Russian Super Cup: 2017

References

External links

1990 births
Living people
People from Cordillera Department
Paraguayan footballers
Association football defenders
Association football wingers
Association football forwards
Association football utility players
Paraguayan Primera División players
12 de Octubre Football Club players
Club Olimpia footballers
Independiente F.B.C. footballers
Primeira Liga players
Liga Portugal 2 players
S.L. Benfica footballers
F.C. Paços de Ferreira players
S.L. Benfica B players
Russian Premier League players
FC Kuban Krasnodar players
FC Spartak Moscow players
Racing Club de Avellaneda footballers
Paraguay under-20 international footballers
Paraguay international footballers
Paraguayan expatriate footballers
Expatriate footballers in Portugal
Expatriate footballers in Russia
Expatriate footballers in Argentina
Paraguayan expatriate sportspeople in Portugal
Paraguayan expatriate sportspeople in Russia
Paraguayan expatriate sportspeople in Argentina